The Europeans were a British new wave group formed in 1981 and disbanded in 1985. They released three albums, none of which achieved much in terms of chart position. In 1989, their former keyboard player and co-lead vocalist Steve Hogarth joined Marillion as lead vocalist. The Europeans should not be confused with the similarly named Europeans, a Bristol band that were active 1977-1979.

Line-up
Steve Hogarth - keyboards, programming, lead vocals
Colin Woore - guitars
Ferg Harper - bass, lead vocals
Geoff Dugmore - drums

History
In 1980, a Scottish band called Motion Pictures (consisting of Harper, Woore, Dugmore) moved to London and advertised for a keyboard player.  Steve Hogarth, who had recently moved to London from Doncaster, was chosen. The band rehearsed in Shepperton, changing their name to The Europeans in early 1981.

Their first appearance on record was as the backing band on John Otway's All Balls and No Willy in 1982. They signed to A&M Records in 1982. Three singles were released before the first album Vocabulary: "The Animal Song", "A.E.I.O.U." and "Recognition". All lead vocals were handled by Harper, except "Kingdom Come" which was sung by Hogarth. Kiki Dee and Toni Childs were among the backing vocalists. Another single, "American People" was released, and the band toured extensively.

The second album, Live was released in February 1984. The LP reached No. 100 in the UK Albums Chart. Later in 1984, the Hogarth-penned "Listen" was released as a single.

A free promo single, "Acid Rain", was released to promote their second studio album (the third overall), Recurring Dreams, which became available in October 1984. Hogarth sang lead vocals on five of the eight tracks. When the Managing Director of A&M left the company a day after the release of the album, promotion took a nosedive. Hogarth and Woore left, forming How We Live in 1985 and signing to CBS.

In August 2005, Recurring Dreams was re-released on CD by Marillion's label Racket Records. The re-issue features liner notes not included in the original 1984 vinyl release.

Discography

Studio albums
 Vocabulary (1983)
 Recurring Dreams (1984)

Live albums
 Live (1984) - UK No. 100

Singles
 "The Animal Song" (1982) - AUS #96
 "AEIOU" (1983)
 "Recognition" (1983)
 "American People" (1983)
 "Typical" (live) (1984)
 "Listen" (1984)

EPs
 Recognition (1983)

Compilation appearances
The Snoopies Album (1981) - various artists compilation

References

Bibliography 
Anne-Aurore Inquimbert,Marillion. L'ère Hogarth, Camion Blanc (France), 2014, 222 p.

External links
The Rainbow Room - Europeans and How We Live Pages. http://www.theeuropeans.co.uk (accessed 8 September 2013)

English new wave musical groups
Musical groups established in 1981
Musical groups disestablished in 1985
Musical groups from London
A&M Records artists